County Route 151 (CR 151) is an east-west county highway serving Randolph and Upshur counties in the U.S. state of West Virginia. The western terminus of the route is at WV 20 in Buckhannon, West Virginia. The eastern terminus is at U.S. Route 33 near Norton, West Virginia. CR 151 is the former alignment of US 33 which was bypassed by the completion of Corridor H of the Appalachian Development Highway System between Buckhannon and Elkins in 1994, and was designated as part of the Staunton-Parkersburg Turnpike National Scenic Byway in 2005.

References

Transportation in Randolph County, West Virginia
Transportation in Upshur County, West Virginia
U.S. Route 33